Feral House is an American book publisher founded in 1989 by Adam Parfrey and based in Port Townsend, Washington.

Early history
The company's first book was The Satanic Witch (1989; originally published in 1971 by Dodd, Mead & Company) by Anton LaVey, the founder of the Church of Satan.

Cultural references
Tim Burton's film Ed Wood was based upon the Feral House title, Nightmare of Ecstasy: The Life and Art of Edward D. Wood Jr. The Feral House title American Hardcore: A Tribal History by Steven Blush has been made into a feature documentary of the same name, released by Sony Classics in the fall of 2006.

Awards
 Readercon | Best Book of 1989:  Apocalypse Culture, edited by Adam Parfrey
 Firecracker Award | Best Music Book of 1999: Lords of Chaos: The Bloody Rise of the Satanic Metal Underground by Michael Moynihan and Didrik Søderlind.

Selected bibliography
 Mudrian, Albert (2004). Choosing Death: The Improbable History of Death Metal & Grindcore. .
 Parfrey, Adam, and Kenn Thomas, eds. (2008). Secret and Suppressed II: Banned Ideas and Hidden History into the 21st Century. . .
 Parfrey, Adam, and Cleetus Nelson. (2014). Citizen Keane: The Big Lies Behind the Big Eyes. . .

See also
 Choosing Death: The Improbable History of Death Metal & Grindcore (published by Feral House)

References

External links
 Feral House Publishing
 Feral House at YouTube

Book publishing companies based in Washington (state)
Companies based in Port Townsend, Washington
Publishing companies established in 1989